Hero of Nation Chandra Shekhar Azad is a 2022 Hindi film starring Ahmad Kabir Shadan, Riitu Sood, Raza Murad, and Zarina Wahab.

Plot
The film is based on Chandra Shekhar Azad's life. The film  will introduce us to Azad's life like his family ties union with freedom fighters as well as the personality.

Cast
 Ahmad Kabir Shadan as Chandra Shekhar Azad 
 Riitu Sood as Durga Bhabhi 
 Raza Murad  as Sitaram Tiwari father of Azad 
 Zarina Wahab as Jagraani Devi mother of Azad 
 Puneet Agarwal as Vishwanath
 Kavita Thakur as Rudranarayan wife

References

External links 
 
 Hero of Nation Chandra Shekhar Azad (2022) - Review, Star Cast, News, Photos
 Hero of Nation Chandra Shekhar Azad (2022) | Hero of Nation Chandra Shekhar Azad Movie | Hero of Nation Chandra Shekhar Azad Bollywood Movie Cast & Crew, Release Date, Review, Photos, Videos
 Hero of Nation Chandra Shekhar Azad

2022 films
2022 biographical drama films
Indian drama films
2020s Hindi-language films
Indian biographical drama films